The Mosque of the Hair of the Prophet, also known as Jame Mui Mobarak, is a mosque near the Kabul Bazaar, in the city of Kandahar, Afghanistan. 

The mosque was built in the 19th century by Kohendil Khan. A canal runs through the mosque's shaded courtyard. At one point, there was a traveler's rest house there.

The hair of Muhammad contained in the mosque was brought to Kandahar at the same time that the cloak of Muhammad was brought to the Mosque of the Cloak of the Prophet Mohammed. The hair is kept in a side chapel in a golden sheath in a casket piled over with holy blankets and banners.

Maulavi Khattib, the caretaker of the mosque, is one of the senior members of the Kandahar Ulema-u-Shura, or Cleric's Council.

References

19th-century mosques
Mosques in Afghanistan
Buildings and structures in Kandahar